Duets is the third studio album by Ane Brun, released 21 November 2005.

Track listing
"Little Lights" (featuring Syd Matters) – 4:11
"Lift Me" (featuring Madrugada) – 4:04
"Rubber & Soul" (featuring Teitur) – 3:11
"This Road" (featuring Lars Bygdén) – 3:56
"Stop" (featuring Liv Widell) – 3:41
"Across the Bridge" (featuring Ellekari Larsson (The Tiny)) – 3:32
"Easier" (featuring Tingsek) – 3:36
"Love & Misery" (featuring Tobias Fröberg) – 3:39
"Such a Common Bird" (featuring Wendy McNeill) – 3:44
"Song No. 6"  (featuring Ron Sexsmith) – 3:58

2005 albums
Ane Brun albums
Vocal duet albums